Eifgenbach is a  river of North Rhine-Westphalia, Germany. Its source is near Wermelskirchen, appr.  south of Wuppertal. It runs in south-westerly direction, and its mouth into the river Dhünn is near Odenthal, appr.  north-east of Cologne.

 of the river basin of the Eifgenbach and its tributaries have been declared nature reserve in order to protect its bio-diversity.

Today the church belongs to the German state of North Rhine-Westfalia and is used both by the Protestants and Catholics as shared church.

See also
List of rivers of North Rhine-Westphalia

References

Rivers of North Rhine-Westphalia
Rivers of Germany